Polycarpa scuba is a species of tunicate or sea squirt in the family Styelidae. It is native to the northeastern Atlantic Ocean where it lives on the seabed.

Distribution and habitat
Polycarpa scuba is found in the northeastern Atlantic Ocean.

References

Stolidobranchia
Animals described in 1971